Leah Clark is an American voice actress, ADR director and ADR script writer working for Funimation. She has provided voices for Japanese anime series and video games. Some of her major roles include Mavis Vermillion in Fairy Tail, Suzuka Asahina in Suzuka, Saki Morimi in Eden of the East, Kagura Tsuchimiya in Ga-Rei: Zero, Eri Sawachika in School Rumble, Mio Naganohara in Nichijou, Blair in Soul Eater, Minami Shimada in Baka and Test, Kobayashi in Miss Kobayashi's Dragon Maid and Himiko Toga in My Hero Academia.

Filmography

Anime

Film

Video games

References

External links
 
 Leah Clark at the CrystalAcids Anime Voice Actor Database
 

American stage actresses
American voice actresses
Living people
American voice directors
American television writers
American women screenwriters
American women television writers
21st-century American actresses
Actresses from New York City
Actresses from Dallas
Screenwriters from New York (state)
Screenwriters from Texas
1979 births